Barbour's vlei rat (Otomys barbouri) is a species of rodent in the family Muridae.
It is found in Kenya and Uganda.
Its natural habitat is subtropical or tropical high-altitude shrubland.
It is threatened by habitat loss.

References

Otomys
Mammals described in 1953
Taxonomy articles created by Polbot